Eunidia saucissea is a species of beetle in the family Cerambycidae. It was described by Stephan von Breuning and Pierre Téocchi in 1978.

References

Eunidiini
Beetles described in 1978